The Oktoberfest of Santa Cruz do Sul is the Oktoberfest edition form the city of Santa Cruz do Sul, Rio Grande do Sul, Brazil. The first edition dates back to 1984, and since then a yearly edition has taken place, except in 1993, when the city was going through financial difficulties, and 2020 caused by COVID-19 pandemic. The last editions have been ten days long. In 2003, 464.900 people attended the event, consuming 210 thousand liters of keg beer.

Data

See also 

 German colonization in Rio Grande do Sul

References 

Santa Cruz do Sul
Folk festivals in Brazil
German-Brazilian culture
Santa Cruz do Sul
Tourist attractions in Rio Grande do Sul
Beer festivals in Brazil
Cultural festivals in Brazil
Festivals established in 1984
1984 establishments in Brazil